Academy of the Pacific Rim Charter Public School is a public charter school in Hyde Park, Massachusetts, United States, which serves students from grades five through twelve.

References

1995 establishments in Massachusetts
Educational institutions established in 1995
High schools in Boston
Middle schools in Boston
Public high schools in Massachusetts